Dreghorn railway station was a railway station serving the village of Dreghorn, North Ayrshire, Scotland. The station was originally part of the Glasgow, Paisley, Kilmarnock and Ayr Railway. The line forms part of National Cycle Route 73, and the site of the station is marked by signs at the junction with Station Brae, Dreghorn.

History 
The station opened on 28 May 1848, and closed in October 1850. The station reopened in May 1868, and closed permanently to passengers on 6 April 1964, although the line between Irvine and Crosshouse was still in use by trains until October 1965.

Gallery

References

Notes

Sources

External links

Video and commentary on the old Towerlands Tram Road

Disused railway stations in North Ayrshire
Railway stations in Great Britain opened in 1848
Railway stations in Great Britain closed in 1850
Railway stations in Great Britain opened in 1868
Railway stations in Great Britain closed in 1964
Beeching closures in Scotland
Former Glasgow and South Western Railway stations
Irvine, North Ayrshire